Double Exposure is a 1944 American crime comedy film directed by William Berke, and starring Chester Morris and Nancy Kelly.

Plot
In New York City, James R. Tarlock (Richard Gaines), a fitness fanatic and publisher of the picture magazine Flick, tells his editor, Larry Burke (Chester Morris), to hire Pat Marvin (Nancy Kelly), a small town Iowa photographer, based on a great photograph of a crashing airplane. After Tarlock leaves, Larry fires a photographer for faking a picture. It turns out that Pat's boyfriend, Ben Scribner (Phillip Terry), faked her airplane picture. Pat is very excited about the job offer. Ben is less enthused about her leaving for the big city, but supports her decision to take the job.

Larry is pleased to discover that his new employee is an attractive woman and takes her out to dinner. Pat seizes an opportunity by taking photographs of Dolores Tucker (Jane Farrar), the wife of much-married millionaire Sonny Tucker (Charles Arnt), laying on the floor of the restaurant's ladies' room after a suicide attempt. For a follow-up, Pat disguises herself as a chorus girl to gain entrance to Sonny's apartment. Dolores walks in shortly afterward and becomes very jealous. Pat has to knock her out with a punch to get away, taking pictures of Dolores and Sonny before and after.

Pat invents a brother named Ben to fend off Larry's amorous advances. To Pat's surprise, the real Ben follows her to New York. When Larry walks in on them, Pat introduces her "brother". Ben reluctantly goes along with the deception. He decides to stay in New York, and talks Larry into giving him a job.

Meanwhile, Sonny asks Pat to marry him, after he divorces Dolores. Dolores makes a scene when she finds them together at a nightclub.

Larry finally finds out about Ben and does not believe Pat when she says she was going to tell him. In anger, he sends Ben on an assignment, one that (unbeknownst to him) puts him aboard a ship bound for Russia. Meanwhile, Tarlock assigns Pat to take a series of photographs of a fake murder for the magazine's readers to try to solve. However, the photo of Pat, as the "victim", looks just like a real police photo of the dead Dolores, slumped face down on a couch. Pat is indicted for murder. Larry tries to get Ben back to corroborate Pat's story, but learns that Ben was not among the survivors when his ship was torpedoed. Larry proves that Dolores was killed by Sonny. Afterward, Larry breaks up with Pat, guilt-ridden over Ben's death. Then Ben shows up and punches him. It turns out Ben spent 20 days on a raft with another woman and married her.

Cast
Chester Morris as Larry Burke
Nancy Kelly as Patricia "Pat" Marvin
Phillip Terry as Ben Scribner
Jane Farrar as Dolores Tucker
Richard Gaines as James R. Tarlock
Charles Arnt as Sonny Tucker
Claire Rochelle as Smitty
Roma Aldrich as Mavis

Reception
Pine Thomas announced a sequel, Over Exposed with William Gargan.

References

External links

Review of film at Variety

1944 films
American crime comedy films
1944 romantic comedy films
American black-and-white films
1940s English-language films
American romantic comedy films
Films about photojournalists
Films directed by William A. Berke
Films set in New York City
1940s crime comedy films
1940s American films